"We Have A Dream" was a special single released as the official song of the Scotland national football team for their 1982 World Cup Campaign. When first released, it reached number 5 in the UK Singles Chart.

2008 version
The single was re-released in 2008 to raise money for BBC Children In Need, featuring a host of celebrities and produced by original writer BA Robertson. The celebrities included Samuel L. Jackson, Ashley Jensen, Dougray Scott, Billy Boyd, Chris Hoy, Ally McCoist, Fred MacAulay, Karen Dunbar and Elaine C. Smith, along with Gregory's Girl actor John Gordon Sinclair, who sang the original. Scotland's 2010 FIFA World Cup qualification match against Norway also saw the Tartan Army play their part, as the fans were recorded roaring along to the track at half-time, helped by a karaoke-style prompt on the big screens at Hampden Park. The single, and subsequent live performance on BBC Scotland's live Children in Need show, also included the vocals of The Gospel Truth Choir.

Charts
1982 version

2008 version

References

External links
 The Tartan Army
  We Have A Dream 2008

1982 songs
1982 in Scotland
Football songs and chants
Scotland national football team songs
Scottish songs
Scotland at the 1982 FIFA World Cup
Songs written by BA Robertson